The Oddities (also known as The Parade of Human Oddities) were a professional wrestling stable in the World Wrestling Federation (WWF) during the Attitude Era of the late 1990s.

History

World Wrestling Federation (1998–1999)
The Jackyl formed the group in May 1998 and called them "The Parade of Human Oddities” after The Truth Commission disbanded. The group consisted of a freak show of wrestlers, including the masked Golga (whose mask was supposed to hide a bone growth disorder yet made him look deformed anyway), the deranged Luna Vachon, the towering Kurrgan (who stood at seven feet tall) and the even larger Giant Silva. On the May 25, 1998 episode of Monday Night Raw, the stable appeared in a segment with Howard Stern Show regulars Hank the Angry Drunken Dwarf and Crackhead Bob. Under the leadership of the Jackyl, the Oddities were a fearsome group of heels though they did not win any titles. Jackyl, however, soon left the Oddities to become the manager of Hell's Henchmen (later renamed The Acolytes), before leaving WWE altogether.

On the July 28, 1998 episode of Raw, the Oddities were re-introduced, this time as babyfaces, by Sable, a former enemy of Vachon who had discovered their fun loving side and made them feel happy in spite of their freakish appearances. The same night, Golga (now turned into a fan of Eric Cartman) defeated Marc Mero, with whom Sable was feuding, and the group celebrated in the ring afterwards. Off-screen, the idea to pair Sable with the Oddities had been Vince McMahon's. The Oddities made their pay-per-view debut at SummerSlam under a new entrance music performed live by Insane Clown Posse, who also started accompanying them to the ring and dancing energetically along with all of them before their matches. Their entrance video featured clips from the 1932 horror film Freaks, as the song and video celebrated the film's message, that the "freaks" were actually decent and polite and that the so-called "normal" people were bad. At the event, Kurrgan, Golga and Giant Silva defeated the numerically superior Kaientai (Taka Michinoku, Dick Togo, Mens Teioh and Sho Funaki) thanks to their enormous individual sizes.

They later started a feud with The Headbangers (Mosh and Thrasher), who feigned friendship to attack the group on September 21, 1998. The Oddities scored several victories against them thanks to interventions by Insane Clown Posse, which caused The Headbangers started targeting them specifically. At Judgment Day: In Your House's Sunday Night Heat tapings in October, the Oddities defeated Los Boricuas (Jose Estrada, Miguel Pérez, Jr. and Jesus Castillo), but The Headbangers intervened and attacked ICP after the bout. This and similar incidents frustrated the duo, who started blaming the Oddities for their beatdowns. Violent J and Shaggy worked to become active wrestlers in the group, but they also demonstrated too much aggression, causing the disqualification of the group in a rematch against Kai En Tai on October 20 in Raw when they attacked the referee. Finally, on the November 23 episode of Monday Night Raw, the Insane Clown Posse turned on the Oddities and joined The Headbangers to assault and humiliate their former stable with Mace. The following week, the remaining Oddities returned the attack in and challenged Mosh and Thrasher to a match in Rock Bottom: In Your House, but they were defeated. The group then enlisted the aid of George "The Animal" Steele, who was introduced in a giant gift box to attack the Headbangers by surprise. He was referred by the announcers as the "original Oddity" . The same month, however, Vachon became a villainess aligning herself with Shane McMahon and abandoned the group to feud over the WWF Women's Championship with Sable.

In 1999, the Oddities began another feud, this time against a coalition between Too Much (Brian Christopher and Scott Taylor) and The Disciples of Apocalypse (8-Ball and Skull), but it was short and unsuccessful. At the Royal Rumble in 1999, Golga made a short appearance before being eliminated by Steve Austin. Kurrgan also appeared and lasted longer than Golga before being eliminated by Kane. In February 1999, all 4 members of the Oddities were released by the WWF.

Independent circuit (2007–2009)
In August 2007, Giant Silva led an unofficial incarnation of the stable named Odd-It-Tees in National Wrestling Superstars, teaming up with a Golga impersonator named Goal-Duh and being managed by George Steele. They were later joined by The Zombie. The team was short-lived and competed for the last time in 2009.

Members

Championships and accomplishments

Wrestling Observer Newsletter awards
Worst Gimmick (1998)
Worst Tag Team (1998)

See also
Dark Carnival (wrestling)
The Dungeon of Doom
The Menagerie

References

External links

WWE teams and stables